The 1991–92 Scottish First Division season was won by Dundee, who were promoted along with Partick Thistle to  the Premier Division. Montrose and Forfar Athletic were relegated.

Table

References

Scottish First Division seasons
2
Scot